Zerelda Amanda Mimms James (July 21, 1845 – November 13, 1900) was the wife and first cousin of Jesse James.

Personal life

Zerelda Amanda Mimms was the daughter of Pastor John Wilson Mimms and Mary Elizabeth James. Her mother was sister to Jesse James' father, Robert S. James.

She and Jesse James married on April 24, 1874, while the James-Younger Gang was still in full force. Of the Jameses and Youngers, Jesse was the first to marry. Zerelda and Jesse had four children, two of whom died in infancy:
 Jesse Edward "Tim" James (August 31, 1875 – March 26, 1951)
 Twins Gould and Montgomery James (born February 28, 1878 and died in infancy)
 Mary Susan James (July 17, 1879–October 11, 1935)

Death
Mimms  died November 13, 1900 in Kansas City, Missouri and was buried at Mount Olivet Cemetery in Kearney, Missouri.  Eighteen months after her death, her husband's body was moved from the James family farm to rest next to hers.

Portrayal in films
2007: In The Assassination of Jesse James by the Coward Robert Ford by Mary-Louise Parker
2001: In American Outlaws by Ali Larter
1995: In Frank and Jesse by Maria Pitillo
1980: In The Long Riders by Savannah Smith Boucher
1949: In I Shot Jesse James by Barbara Woodell
1957: In The True Story of Jesse James by Hope Lange 
1953: In The Great Jesse James Raid by Barbara Woodell
1939: In Jesse James by Nancy Kelly
1927: In Jesse James by Nora Lane
1921: In Jesse James as the Outlaw by Marguerite Hungerford

References

1845 births
1900 deaths
James–Younger Gang
People from Missouri